The Central Committee of the 22nd Congress of the Communist Party of the Soviet Union was in session from 1961 until 1966. It elected, at its 1st Plenary Session, the 22nd Presidium, the 22nd Secretariat and the 22nd Party Control Committee of the Communist Party of the Soviet Union.

Plenums
The Central Committee was not a permanent institution. It convened plenary sessions. 14 CC plenary sessions were held between the 22nd Congress and the 23rd Congress. When the CC was not in session, decision-making power was vested in the internal bodies of the CC itself; that is, the Politburo and the Secretariat. None of these bodies were permanent either; typically they convened several times a month.

Composition

Members

Candidates

References

Citations

Bibliography
 

Central Committee of the Communist Party of the Soviet Union
1961 establishments in the Soviet Union
1966 disestablishments in the Soviet Union